Shenzhen Universiade Sports Centre, also known as Shenzhen Universiade Centre, Longgang Universiade Sports Centre, or Longgang Stadium, is a multi-use sport facilities complex in Longgang, Shenzhen, Guangdong, China. The sports centre was completed in 2011. It is used mostly for association football and athletics competitions, and hosted some events at the 2011 Summer Universiade.

The stadium has a capacity of 60,334 spectators. The Shenzhen Dayun Arena has a capacity of 18,000 spectators, while the aquatic centre has a capacity of 3,000 spectators.

On 15 September 2018, the NHL played one pre-season game at the stadium between the Calgary Flames and Boston Bruins.

References

External links 
 Graphic of interior of stadium (archived 3 April 2008)
 Photo of ground breaking ceremony (archived 28 August 2008)
 Information on new stadium
 Cricinfo profile

Football venues in China
Sports venues completed in 2011
2011 establishments in China
Sports venues in Shenzhen
Cricket grounds in China
University sports venues in China
Longgang District, Shenzhen
Gerkan, Marg and Partners buildings